Martha Mvungi, née Martha V. Mlangala is a Tanzanian writer in both Swahili and English.

Life
Martha V. Mlangala was born in Kidugala, Njombe, Southern Tanzania. She was educated at the University of Edinburgh and the University of Dar es Salaam. After a career teaching at various levels, she joined the Department of Education at the University of Dar es Salaam.

Three Solid Stones (1975) was a collection of Hehe and Bena folk tales in English translation.

Since 1995 Mvungi has been the Director of a school, Ecacs Schools, which she founded on the outskirts of Dar es Salaam.

Works
English
 'Was It an Illusion?', Darlite, IV, 2 (1970), 34-38
 Three Solid Stones, 1975. London: Heinemann Educational. African Writers Series 159.
 Yasin's Dilemma, 1985
 Yasin in Trouble, 1990

Swahili
 Hana hatia, 1975
 Chale Anatumwa sokoni, 1982
 Lwidiko, 2003

References

Tanzanian women writers
Year of birth missing (living people)
Living people